Ferndale station is a Baltimore Light Rail station in Glen Burnie, Maryland. Northbound trains depart for Timonium, continuing on at off-peak hours to Hunt Valley; southbound trains depart for Glen Burnie. There is currently no free public parking or bus connections at this station.

Ferndale is located on 10 Broadview Boulevard across from Ferndale Road. An extension of Ferndale Road crosses the tracks from Baltimore-Annapolis Boulevard (MD 648), but only runs one way westbound. A local firehouse is also located near the station, and has a private  access road to Route 648 that crosses the tracks.

The station itself is the least used station in all of the Baltimore Light Rail network with 93 exits/entries in 2017.

Station layout

References

External links
Schedules

Baltimore Light Rail stations
Glen Burnie, Maryland
Railway stations in Anne Arundel County, Maryland
Railway stations in the United States opened in 1887
Railway stations in the United States opened in 1993